FK Kožuf is a football club from Gevgelija, North Macedonia. They are currently competing in the Macedonian Second League.

History
The club was founded in 1922.

They played in the Macedonian First League back in 1994–95 under the name Kožuf Vinojug.

Honours

 Macedonian Second League:
Winners (1): 1993–94

Recent seasons

1The 2019–20 season was abandoned due to the COVID-19 pandemic in North Macedonia.

Current squad
As of 23 February 2023.

References

External links
Official website 

Club info at MacedonianFootball 
Football Federation of Macedonia 

 
Kozuf
Association football clubs established in 1922
1922 establishments in Yugoslavia